Zhoushan is a city in Zhejiang, China.

Zhoushan may also refer to:

 Zhoushan Islands, in Zhejiang, China
 Zhoushan Island, principal island of Zhoushan Islands
 4925 Zhoushan, main belt minor planet
 Chusan Palm, or Trachycarpus fortunei, a palm native to central China
 HVDC Zhoushan, the first HVDC powerline in China